This is a list of Tamil language films produced in the Tamil cinema in India that are released/scheduled to be released in the year 2019.

Box office collection 
The highest-grossing Kollywood films released in 2019, by worldwide box office gross revenue, are as follows.

Released films 
The list of released and scheduled to be released films in quarter wise sections.

January – March

April – June

July – September

October – December

Awards

References

External links 

Tamil
2019
Tamil
2010s Tamil-language films